The Federal Bureau of Investigation (FBI) 9/11 Review Commission was formed by Congress in January 2014 to conduct a comprehensive review of the recommendations related to the FBI that were proposed by the original 9/11 Commission. The commission, which was publicly announced by Republican Congressman Frank Wolf of Virginia, consisted of three congressionally appointed members supported by an executive director and staff.

On March 26, 2014, the commission's members testified regarding their initial progress before the House Appropriations Subcommittee on Commerce, Justice, Science and Related Agencies.

Following 14 months of research, interviews, briefings and field visits the commission issued an unclassified public version of its final report titled The FBI: Protecting the Homeland in the 21st Century on March 25, 2015. Its overarching conclusion was that while the FBI had established comprehensive structures to support its intelligence mission, there remained a significant gap between the articulated principles of its intelligence programs and their effectiveness in practice.

Commissioners 
 Bruce Hoffman - Professor, Georgetown University Edmund A. Walsh School of Foreign Service
 Edwin Meese - Former United States Attorney General
 Tim Roemer - Former Congressman from Indiana and Former United States Ambassador to India

Staff Members

Case Studies 
As part of its review, the Commission selected five case studies to examine the FBI's response to high-profile terrorist plots and attacks since 2008.

 Najibullah Zezi, an Afghan-American arrested in September 2009 for working with al Qaeda to plan suicide bombings on the New York City Subway system
 David Headley, an American terrorist of Pakistani origin who conspired in plotting the 2008 Mumbai attacks
 Nidal Hasan, a former American Army Major convicted of killing 13 people and injuring more than 30 others in the Fort Hood mass shooting in November 2009
 Faisal Shahzad, a Pakistani-American citizen who was arrested for the attempted Times Square car bombing in May 2010
 Tamerlan Tsarnaev and Dzhokhar Tsarnaev who, together, killed 3 people and injured nearly 300 others by bombing the Boston Marathon in April 2013

Individuals interviewed by the Commission 
Current and former government officials who were interviewed by the commission included:

Further reading 

 Interview: Dr. Bruce Hoffman on the Release of the 9/11 Review Commission Report, by Sarah Maksoud, Georgetown Security Studies Review (March 27, 2015)
 A Look at the FBI 14 Years After 9/11, GW Today (April 15, 2015)
 How the FBI Reinvented Itself After 9/11, by Carmen Nobel, Harvard Business School (April 27, 2016)
 The FBI’s Role in National Security, by Zachary Laub, Council on Foreign Relations (June 21, 2017)

References 

9/11 Commission
Federal Bureau of Investigation
2014 establishments in the United States